Matúš Opatovský (born 22 July 1994) is a Slovak footballer who currently plays as a midfielder.

Club career

AS Trenčín
He made his debut for AS Trenčín on 25 September 2012 against MŠK Žilina, entering in as a substitute in place of Aldo Baéz in the 79th minute of the game.

References

External links
AS Trenčín profile
 Eurofotbal profile
 
 Futbalnet profile

1994 births
Living people
Slovak footballers
Association football midfielders
AS Trenčín players
Slovak Super Liga players
Sportspeople from Trenčín